Pope Adeodatus I (570 – 8 November 618), also called Deodatus I or Deusdedit, was the bishop of Rome from 19 October 615 to his death. He was the first priest to be elected pope since John II in 533. The first use of lead seals or bullae on papal documents is attributed to him. His feast day is 8 November.

Biography
Adeodatus was born in Rome, the son of a subdeacon named Stephen. He served as a priest for 40 years before his election and was the first priest to be elected pope since John II in 533.

Pontificate
Almost nothing is known about Adeodatus I's pontificate. It represents the second wave of opposition to Gregory the Great's papal reforms, the first being the pontificate of Sabinian. He reversed the practice of his predecessor, Boniface IV, of filling the papal administrative ranks with monks by recalling the clergy to such positions and by ordaining some 14 priests, the first ordinations in Rome since Gregory's pontificate. According to tradition, Adeodatus was the first pope to use lead seals (bullae) on papal documents, which in time came to be called "papal bulls". One bulla dating from his reign is still preserved, the obverse of which represents the Good Shepherd in the midst of His sheep, with the letters Alpha and Omega underneath, while the reverse bears the inscription: Deusdedit Papæ.

In August 618, an earthquake struck Rome, followed by an outbreak of scabies. Adeodatus died 8 November 618, and was eventually succeeded by Boniface V. His feast day is 8 November. He is also a saint in the Eastern Orthodox Church as one of the pre-Schism "Orthodox Popes of Rome".

See also

 List of popes
 List of Catholic saints

References

External links

618 deaths
Italian popes
7th-century archbishops
Popes of the Byzantine Papacy
Italian Roman Catholic saints
Papal saints
7th-century Christian saints
Popes
Year of birth unknown
7th-century popes
Eastern Orthodox saints
Burials at St. Peter's Basilica